Wan Guanghua (born 1961 in Jiangdu, Jiangsu) is a Chinese economist. He is Principal Economist at the Asian Development Bank. Formerly Project Director at UNU-WIDER, he has taught and researched in development economics an applied econometrics at a range of universities including the University of New England and the University of Sydney and he is an honorary professor at several leading universities in China. He is particularly noted for pioneering work in the development of regression-based decomposition techniques for inequality and poverty accounting. He has many academic papers published in peer reviewed journals.

Key works

Books

Chapters in books

References

Living people
1961 births
Educators from Yangzhou
Economists from Jiangsu
Writers from Yangzhou